The Women's 7.5 kilometre sprint biathlon competition at the 2002 Winter Olympics was held on 13 February, at Soldier Hollow. Competitors raced over two 2.5 kilometre loops and one 3.0 kilometre loop of the skiing course, shooting two times, once prone and once standing. Each miss was penalized by requiring the competitor to race over a 150-metre penalty loop.

Results 

Two of the medalists from the women's Individual race were also strong challengers in the sprint, led by Magdalena Forsberg, the five-time defending World Cup overall champion, as well as the defending World Cup winner in the sprint. Kati Wilhelm was the defending world champion and Galina Kukleva was defending champion from the Nagano Games. The test event at Soldier Hollow in 2001 saw Uschi Disl take the win, ahead of Liv Grete Skjelbreid-Poirée and individual champion Andrea Henkel. Entering the Olympics, the sprint World Cup standings were closely contested, with Disl, Olena Zubrilova, Forsberg, Olga Pyleva and Wilhelm separated by just 7 points. Skjelbreid-Poirée was further behind, but was coming in on a winning streak, having taken each of the last two World Cup sprints.

Henkel, the first of the above to go out, was unable to recapture her shooting form from two days before, missing once on each shoot, and finishing well back, in 25th. Her teammate Wilhelm, starting shortly behind her, had no such problems, shooting clear and leading at each of the time checks. France's Florence Baverel-Robert also shot clear, but ended up 45 seconds behind Wilhelm. Pyleva and 1998 Olympic individual champion Ekaterina Dafovska were with in 7 seconds of Wilhelm after the first shoot, but both lost out on the second shoot, Pyleva missing once and finishing 8th, while Dafovska missed twice and ended up 15th.

Disl was also close to Wilhelm after the first shoot, but missed a shot on the second, leaving her too much to make up. She did cut into Wilhelm's time on the final loop, but not by enough, coming in 15.6 seconds behind. Kukleva was close to Wilhelm's time after the first shoot, but fell back, despite hitting all her shots, ending up nearly a minute behind. Skjelbreid-Poirée came the closest to catching Wilhelm at the first time check, finishing the lap just 4 seconds behind the German, but missed a shot on the second loop, and slumped behind after that, finishing 43 seconds back. Forsberg lost her chance for gold on the first round of shooting, missing one, and while she shot clear on the second opportunity, she continued to lose time. However, she did just manage to edge Skjelbreid-Poirée for the bronze medal.

The race was started at 13:30.

References

Sports-Reference.com - Women's 7.5 km Sprint - 2002 Olympics

Women's biathlon at the 2002 Winter Olympics